There were four different archery competitions at the 1992 Summer Olympics. The format of the previous Olympics was dropped for this Olympiad, with an entirely new system being put in place.

For the first time, all archery was done at a single distance, 70 metres.  All archers took place in the ranking round, in which they shot 144 arrows.  These scores were used to determine both individual and team ranks.  The top 32 individual archers in each division (men's and women's) were seeded into a single-elimination tournament called the "Olympic round".  Nations that sent the maximum number of three archers in either or both division also had the chance for those three archers to compete as a team; the top 16 teams in each division were also seeded into single-elimination tournaments.

Winners of the semifinal in each of the four competitions faced each other for the gold and silver medals, while the semifinal losers faced off for the bronze medal and fourth place.  All other rankings were determined by the score of the archer or team in the round they were defeated.  That is, fifth through eighth place were determined by the quarterfinal scores of the four archers defeated in the quarterfinals.

Medal summary

Events

Medal table

Participating nations
A total of 44 nations competed in this sport.

References

External links
International Olympic Committee results database

 
1992 Summer Olympics events
O
1992